Kiini Ibura Salaam (born 1973) is an essayist, science fiction and fantasy short story writer, and painter.  Her short story collection Ancient, Ancient won the James Tiptree, Jr. Award for 2012.

She is the daughter of writer and activist Kalamu ya Salaam.

Works

Short story collections
 Ancient, Ancient (Aqueduct Press, 2012)
 When the World Wounds (Third Man Books, 2016)

Anthologies and essays
 Dark Matter
 Dark Matter II: Reading the Bones
 Mojo: Conjure Stories
 Colonize This!: Young Women of Color on Today's Feminism
 Best Black Women's Erotica 2

Awards
 2012 James Tiptree, Jr. Award for Ancient, Ancient''

See also
Afrofuturism
Black science fiction

References

External links
 Official website and blog

Women science fiction and fantasy writers
African-American writers
Living people
1973 births
21st-century American short story writers
American women short story writers
American short story writers
American science fiction writers
Afrofuturist writers
21st-century American women writers
21st-century African-American women writers
21st-century African-American writers
20th-century African-American people
20th-century African-American women